Jonathan Alejandro Salvador Lara (born 9 September 1991) is a Chilean footballer that currently plays for Deportes Iberia in the Segunda División Profesional de Chile.

External links
 
 

1991 births
Living people
Sportspeople from Concepción, Chile
Chilean footballers
Deportes Concepción (Chile) footballers
C.D. Arturo Fernández Vial footballers
Unión Española footballers
Unión San Felipe footballers
Club Deportivo Palestino footballers
Rangers de Talca footballers
Deportes Iberia footballers
Primera B de Chile players
Chilean Primera División players
Segunda División Profesional de Chile players
Association football goalkeepers
21st-century Chilean people